Agrotis spinifera, or Gregson's dart, is a moth of the family Noctuidae. The species was first described by Jacob Hübner in 1808. It is found in southern Europe, Arabia to southern Africa, Madagascar, Turkey, Iraq, Iran, Afghanistan, Pakistan, Kashmir, India to Myanmar and Sri Lanka.

Description
The wingspan is 32–34 mm. It differs from Agrotis segetum in having almost quite obsolete sub-basal antemedial and postmedial lines of forewings. Submarginal line strongly dentate with dark streaks on it. Orbicular elongate with a dark streak runs from it to the reniform. Claviform is very elongate and filled in with black.

References

External links 

 "(B104) BF2086 Gregson's Dart Agrotis spinifera (Hübner, [1808])". UKMoths.
 Insecticidal trial against the cutworm, Agrotis spinifera
 Lepiforum e.V.

Agrotis
Moths described in 1808
Owlet moths of Europe
Owlet moths of Africa
Moths of Asia
Taxa named by Jacob Hübner